Caperonia (false croton) is a genus of plants of the family Euphorbiaceae first described as a genus in 1825. The genus is native to tropical and subtropical America and  Africa.

Species

References

Chrozophoreae
Euphorbiaceae genera